Edema blisters (also known as "Edema bulla", "Hydrostatic bulla," and "Stasis blister") are a cutaneous condition that develop in patients with an acute exacerbation of chronic edema, particularly of the lower extremities, and in the setting of anasarca.

See also 
 Delayed blister
 List of cutaneous conditions

References 

Skin conditions resulting from physical factors